Sheng Yilun (born September 23, 1992), also known as Peter Sheng, is a Chinese actor and model.

Career
In 2012, Sheng made his acting debut in the Chinese short film, The Mirror Effect.

In 2015, Sheng rose to fame for his role in the hit Chinese historical romance parody web series, Go Princess Go.

In 2017, he starred in the romantic comedy drama Pretty Li Huizhen, fantasy drama A Life Time Love, as well as historical comedy web series Oh My General.

In 2018, Sheng was confirmed to make his big screen debut in the film A Fangirl's Romance.

In 2020, Sheng starred in the historical fantasy drama God of Lost Fantasy.

Filmography

Film

Television series

Variety show

Discography

Awards and nominations

References

External links 

1992 births
Living people
Male actors from Hangzhou
21st-century Chinese male actors
Chinese male television actors
Chinese male film actors
Chinese male models
Participants in Chinese reality television series